The Stockton Ports are a Minor League Baseball team of the California League and the Single-A affiliate of the Oakland Athletics. They are located in Stockton, California, and are named for the city's seaport. The team plays its home games at Banner Island Ballpark which opened in 2005 and seats over 5,000 people.

The Ports were established in 1941 as members of the California League and have won the California League championship 11 times.

History
Baseball first came to Stockton in the 1860s. At the time, Stockton fielded a team in an earlier incarnation of the California League. In 1888, the Stockton team won the California League pennant with a record of 41–12. That same team also gained a bit of notoriety as a possible inspiration for "Casey at the Bat", a famous baseball poem by Ernest Thayer. Thayer was a journalist for the San Francisco Examiner at the time and the games were hosted in a ballpark on Banner Island, a place once known as Mudville.

The Stockton Flyers were established as a charter member of the California League in 1941. The league suspended operations in June 1942 due to World War II. The Flyers were rechristened as the Stockton Ports to recognize Stockton's status as an inland port city when the league resumed operations in 1946. That season, the Ports went on to win their first California League pennant.

In 1947, the Ports won the California League title again without a major league affiliation (they had a limited working agreement with the Pacific Coast League's Oakland Oaks). After going 24–18 through June 4, they went on a 26-game winning streak and took first place, never to relinquish again in that season. The win streak is one of the longest in professional baseball and is still a California League record. The Ports finished that season with a record of 95–45 and 16 games ahead of the two teams tied for second place. During Minor League Baseball's centennial celebration in 2001, baseball historians Bill Weiss and Marshall Wright rated the 1947 Ports as one of the 100 greatest minor league teams of all time, ranked at number 98.

Owned by Stockton local Carl W. Thompson, Sr. (1971–1973), the Ports disbanded after the 1972 season, coming back as an affiliate of the Seattle Mariners in 1978. The Ports won more games in the 1980s than any other team in Minor League Baseball. In an homage to the team in the Ernest Thayer poem, the Ports were renamed the Mudville Nine in 2000 and 2001, then returned to the Ports name in 2002.

In 2005, the Ports moved to the newly built Banner Island Ballpark and became affiliates of the Oakland Athletics. The team won its 11th California League championship in 2008 with a 9–3 victory over the Lancaster JetHawks on September 14.

In conjunction with Major League Baseball's restructuring of Minor League Baseball in 2021, the Ports were organized into the Low-A West. In 2022, the Low-A West became known as the California League, the name historically used by the regional circuit prior to the 2021 reorganization, and was reclassified as a Single-A circuit.

Major league affiliations
1941: Los Angeles Angels, PCL
1946: Independent
1947–1948: Oakland Oaks, PCL
1949: Chicago White Sox, AL
1950–1951: Independent
1952: St. Louis Browns, AL
1953–1954: Chicago Cubs, NL
1955: Oakland Oaks, PCL
1956–1957: Baltimore Orioles, AL
1958: St. Louis Cardinals, NL
1959–1971: Baltimore Orioles, AL
1972: California Angels, AL
1978: Seattle Mariners, AL
1979–2000: Milwaukee Brewers, AL (1979–97)/NL (1998–2000)
2001–2002: Cincinnati Reds, NL
2003–2004: Texas Rangers, AL
2005–present Oakland Athletics, AL

Roster

Notable Ports alumni

Baseball Hall of Fame alumni

Pat Gillick (1959) inducted 2011
Mike Piazza (2007) inducted 2016

Notable alumni

 Joe Altobelli (1969, MGR) Manager: 1983 World Champion – Baltimore Orioles
 Daric Barton (2005)
 Don Baylor (1968) MLB All-Star; 1995 NL Manager of the Year; 1979 AL Most Valuable Player
 Bo Belinsky (1959)
 Paul Blair (1963) 2 x MLB All-Star; 8 x Gold Glove
 Bruce Bochte (1972) MLB All-Star
 Skye Bolt 
 Dallas Braden (2005)
 Milton Bradley (2005) MLB All-Star
 Travis Buck (2005)
 Al Bumbry (1969) MLB All-Star; 1973 AL Rookie of the Year
 Enos Cabell (1970)
 Trevor Cahill (2008) MLB All-Star
 Coco Crisp (2015) 
 Bobby Crosby (2005) 2004 AL Rookie of the Year
 Vince DiMaggio (1948) 2 x MLB All-Star
 Josh Donaldson 3 x MLB All-Star; 2015 AL Most Valuable Player
 Sean Doolittle (2008, 2012, 2015, 2017) MLB All-Star
 Cal Eldred (1990)
 Mike Epstein (1965; led the league in batting (.338) and home runs (30))
 Keith Foulke (2008) MLB All-Star
Zack Gelof
 Sonny Gray (2017) MLB All-Star
 Pumpsie Green (1955)
 Bobby Grich (1968) 6 x MLB All-Star
 Darryl Hamilton (1987)
 Dave Henderson (1978) MLB All-Star
 Geoff Jenkins (1995) MLB All-Star
 Davey Johnson (1962) 4 x MLB All-Star; 2 x MLB Manager of the Year; Manager: 1986 World Series Champion – New York Mets
 Doug Jones (1979) MLB All-Star
 Darold Knowles (1962) MLB All-Star
 Dave LaPoint (1979)
 Dave May (1963) MLB All-Star
 Jim Morris (1987) Subject of Movie: The Rookie
 Juan Nieves(1982)
 Jerry Remy (1972) MLB All-Star
 Merv Rettenmund (1965–1966)
 Addison Russell (2013–2014) MLB All-Star
 Ben Sheets (1999) 4 x MLB All-Star
 Gary Sheffield (1987) 9 x MLB All Star; 1992 NL Batting Title
 Kurt Suzuki (2005) MLB All-Star
 Dale Sveum (1983, 1989) 
 Zack Thornton
 Brett Tomko (2010)
 Fernando Vina (1997) MLB All-Star
 Edison Volquez (2004) MLB All-Star
 Joey Wagman
 Brad Ziegler (2005)
 Ben Zobrist (2015) 3 x MLB All-Star; 2016 World Series Most Valuable Player
 Mudville Nine players

References

External links
 
 Statistics from Baseball-Reference

Baseball teams established in 1941
Baseball in Stockton, California
Chicago White Sox minor league affiliates
Baltimore Orioles minor league affiliates
Chicago Cubs minor league affiliates
St. Louis Cardinals minor league affiliates
California Angels minor league affiliates
Milwaukee Brewers minor league affiliates
Cincinnati Reds minor league affiliates
Texas Rangers minor league affiliates
Oakland Athletics minor league affiliates
California League teams
Professional baseball teams in California
1941 establishments in California